The 1929 Stanley Cup Finals was played by the defending champion New York Rangers and the Boston Bruins. This was the first time in Stanley Cup Finals history that two American-based teams met in the Finals. Boston won the series to win its first championship.

Paths to the Finals
The playoffs were now between division finishers of each division, rather than a division champion from each division. The Boston Bruins knocked off the Montreal Canadiens, the New York Rangers beat the New York Americans, and the Toronto Maple Leafs beat the Detroit Cougars. The Rangers beat Toronto and then the Bruins won their first Stanley Cup defeating the Rangers. In the process, Boston became one of the few Cup winners in history to not lose a single game in the playoffs, and the last team until 1952 to win every playoff game they had.

Game summaries
The Final was a best-of-three series.

Goalie Cecil "Tiny" Thompson backstopped the Bruins to consecutive wins and posted the third Stanley Cup shutout for a rookie. Game two was played at Madison Square Garden.

Thompson faced his brother Paul Thompson, a forward with the Rangers, in the Finals. It marked the first time a set of brothers faced each other in a goaltender-forward combination in Stanley Cup Finals history. Tiny said of the matchup: "When I played goal for Boston against Paul (in) the final of 1929, he was just a rookie. It was really no contest."

Stanley Cup engraving
The 1929 Stanley Cup was presented to Bruins captain Lionel Hitchman by NHL President Frank Calder following the Bruins 2–1 win over the Rangers in game two.

The following Bruins players and staff had their names engraved on the Stanley Cup

1928–29 Boston Bruins

See also
1928–29 NHL season

References & notes

Stanley Cup
Stanley Cup Finals
Boston Bruins games
New York Rangers games
Stanley Cup Finals
Ice hockey competitions in New York City
Ice hockey competitions in Boston
Stanley Cup Finals
1920s in Boston
Stanley Cup Finals
1920s in Manhattan
Boston Garden
Madison Square Garden